Original Penguin (also known simply as Penguin) is an American clothing line. With roots in the 1950s and 60s, the brand specializes in clothing, footwear, and eyewear. It is sold in North America, South America, Central America, Europe and Asia-Pacific (Philippines). It has stores in 5 states in the US.

History
The brand was introduced in 1955 by Munsingwear, a Minneapolis-based underwear and military garment manufacturer, when it launched the Original Penguin golf shirt in the United States. Munsingwear was for many years famous for its union suits, an undergarment consisting of an undershirt and underdrawers combined in a single garment. The company was also said to be the originator of the classic golf shirt. In 1996, the brand was bought by Perry Ellis International.

External links
Original Penguin Official Site
Original Penguin European Site
Perry Ellis Official Site

Sources

Perry Ellis International brands
Clothing brands of the United States
Shoe brands
Sportswear brands